Prawira Bandung is an Indonesian basketball club based in the city of Bandung, West Java province. It was founded by Lilian Wijaya in 1991 as Hadtex Indosyntec. The club is a member of the Perbasi's top division since 1994. They won championships in 1994, 1997, and 1998. The club's most recent victory was in the 2010 Jakarta Governor's Cup event, where it won the championship.

History 
According to the official club website, Garuda Bandung was founded in 1991 by Lilian Wijaya, and carried the name Hadtex Indosyntec. The project was a brainchild of the Board of Directors of PT Hadtex Indosyntec. In 1994 Hadtex Indosyntec joined the KOBATAMA, and they changed its name into Panasia Indosyntec in 1996. The club subsequently went into sponsorship changes. In 2004, the club was renamed Senatama Garuda Panasia, and in 2007, under new management, the club rechristened itself as Garuda Panasia Bandung. In 2008, it's sponsored by Telkom Indonesia and renamed Garuda Flexi Bandung.

Garuda Bandung reach the finals since 1994. From the 7 final stages, Garuda get the champions in 1994 (as Hadtex Indosyntec), 1997, and 1998 (as Panasia Indosyntec), and Garuda get the runner-ups in 1995, 1996, 2000 (lose to Aspac Jakarta), and 2008 (lose to Satria Muda).

PT Persib Bandung Bermartabat (PBB) bought Garuda Bandung in 2018 and changed the club's name into Prawira Bandung

Head coaches

Ownerships and fanbase 
Prawira Bandung founded on 1991 by Lilian Wijaya. Now, it owned by Teddy Tjahyono.

Rosters

Notable alumni

Players
- Set a club record or won an individual award as a professional player.
- Played at least one official international match for his senior national team at any time.
  Johannis Winar

Coaches
- Set a club record or won an individual award as a professional coach.
- Functioned as head coach for any senior national team at least once at an official international match.

 Johannis Winar

References 

Bandung
Basketball teams in Indonesia
Basketball teams established in 1991
1991 establishments in Indonesia